KLIT (93.3 FM) is a Spanish language Christian format radio station that serves the Laredo, Texas, area.

In July 2019, the station lost access to its licensed site; it is nominally operating from a temporary site.

External links

LIT
Talk radio stations in the United States
LIT
LIT
Radio stations established in 1983